Mellisa is a feminine given name; similar to Melissa. Notable people with the name include:

 Mellisa Hollingsworth (born 1980), Canadian athlete
 Mellisa Santokhi-Seenacherry, First Lady of Suriname

See also 
Mellisai Mannar another name for M. S. Viswanathan

Feminine given names